Bush honeysuckle is a common name for several plants and may refer to:

Diervilla, native to eastern North America
Lonicera, several species of which have been introduced to and become invasive in various temperate regions:
Lonicera maackii, native to northeastern Asia and invasive in the United States and New Zealand
Lonicera morrowii, native to eastern Asia and invasive in the United States
Lonicera tatarica, native to Asia and invasive in the United States

See also
Honeysuckle bush
Honeysuckle (disambiguation)